Marilynessa is a genus of gastropods belonging to the subfamily Hadrinae  of the family Camaenidae.

The species of this genus are found in Australia.

Species:

Marilynessa findera 
Marilynessa macneilli 
Marilynessa starena 
Marilynessa thorogoodi 
Marilynessa yulei

References

 Stanisic, J.; Shea, M.; Potter, D.; Griffiths, O. (2010). Australian land snails. Volume 1. A field guide to eastern Australian species. Queensland Museum, Brisbane. 596 pp.
 Bank, R. A. (2017). Classification of the Recent terrestrial Gastropoda of the World. Last update: July 16th, 2017

Camaenidae
Gastropod genera